Canoe polo at the 2017 World Games.

Medalists

See also 
 Canoe polo at the World Games

References 

2017 World Games
Canoe polo at the World Games